Kardaneh (also Romanized as Kārdāneh; also known as Kārdāne and Karooneh) is a village in Shonbeh Rural District, Shonbeh and Tasuj District, Dashti County, Bushehr Province, Iran. At the 2006 census, its population was 57, in 12 families.

References 

Populated places in Dashti County